Estcourt Station (elevation: , pop. 4) is a village within the Big Twenty Township in the state of Maine. It is the northernmost point in Maine and New England.  The ZIP Code for Estcourt Station is 04741.

Overview
Estcourt Station is located on the Canada–United States border between Maine and Quebec, at the southern end of Lake Pohenegamook in the North Maine Woods region. It derives its name from the adjacent village of Estcourt, Quebec, which is part of the larger municipality of Pohénégamook. The Estcourt Station–Pohénégamook Border Crossing is staffed during the work week, usually for processing logging trucks that access Maine's North Woods to haul timber to Quebec saw mills.

The populated part of Estcourt Station is essentially a sliver of the village of Estcourt that was cut off when the international boundary was properly surveyed through the area (see Webster–Ashburton Treaty). It consists of a row of several houses along Rue Frontière, a street on the Quebec side of the border, some of which were built before the survey and which the border now passes through. 

Although the US census reports that four people live in the village, according to a Canada Border Services Agency agent no one lives in Estcourt Station full-time . A few U.S. residents live in the village during the summer. They must follow the hours of the border control stations; thus, after 5 p.m. on Friday, they cannot leave until 8 a.m. Monday. Anyone wishing to travel between Pohénégamook and Estcourt Station legally after hours would have to travel on hundreds of miles of private logging roads through the North Maine Woods that are difficult to navigate during spring and summer rains, and almost inaccessible because of snow during the winter; there are no towns or paved roads in the North Maine Woods. Likewise, Estcourt Station is connected to Hydro-Québec for electricity. The community receives drinking water and other municipal services from Pohénégamook.

Canadian National Railway's transcontinental main line between Halifax and Montreal passes immediately north of Rue de la Frontière.

Michel Jalbert incident

In October 2002, a Pohénégamook resident named Michel Jalbert, was arrested by two U.S. Border Patrol officers  from the Canadian border after he had driven across to Estcourt Station to buy gas for his truck (Location:). After he spent more than a month in a US federal prison, he was released and allowed to return to Canada on a $5,000 bond. U.S. agents said Jalbert had driven past a closed U.S. Customs Service post and not declared he was entering the United States. They also cited him for being a convicted Canadian felon (he was 19-years-old when he was given a non-custodial sentence for breaking and entering in 1990) and being in possession of an illegal firearm; his shotgun is very common in this part of Canada during the partridge hunting season. In March 2003 Jalbert pled guilty in a US federal court to a charge he crossed the US-Canadian border illegally; his sentence was a plea deal that was 35 days time already served in jail, two years of supervised release and no fines (prior to the deal he faced a maximum sentence of 20½ years and up to $500,000 in fines).

The US Secretary of State at the time, Colin Powell called the incident "unfortunate" during a visit to Canada. The US Border agents that stopped Jalbert were said to have only recently been transferred from the Mexico–United States border (as part of an effort to strengthen the USA after the 9/11 attacks in 2001). Jalbert believed he was stopped and made an example to show the rules were being tightened. After the incident the gas station in Estcourt Station said its trade significantly declined. The gas station has since been closed as of September 2021.

Climate

According to the Köppen climate classification system, Estcourt Station has a Warm-summer, humid continental climate (Dfb). Dfb climates are characterized by a least one month having an average mean temperature ≤ , at least four months with an average mean temperature ≥ , all months with an average mean temperature <  and no significant precipitation difference between seasons. Although most summer days are comfortably humid in Estcourt Station, episodes of warmth and high humidity can occur with heat index values > . The average wettest month is July which corresponds with the annual peak in thunderstorm activity. Episodes of extreme cold and wind can occur with wind chill values < . The average annual snowfall (Sep-May) is > .

Ecology

According to the A. W. Kuchler U.S. potential natural vegetation types, Estcourt Station would have a dominant vegetation type of Northern Hardwoods/Spruce (108) with a dominant vegetation form of Northern Hardwoods (23). The spring bloom typically peaks around May 17 and fall color usually peaks around September 25.

See also
Hyder, Alaska and Stewart, British Columbia
Beebe Plain, Vermont and Beebe Plain, Stanstead, Quebec

Notes

External links
The Immigration Case of Michel Jalbert Teaches Larger Lessons
David Rennie, "Village Customs border on the ridiculous"
 Wright, Virginia M. "Nowhere Land." Down East: The Magazine of Maine, August 2019

Villages in Aroostook County, Maine
North Maine Woods
Border irregularities of the United States